In botanical nomenclature, a form (forma, plural formae) is one of the "secondary" taxonomic ranks, below that of variety, which in turn is below that of species; it is an infraspecific taxon. If more than three ranks are listed in describing a taxon, the "classification" is being specified, but only three parts make up the "name" of the taxon: a genus name, a specific epithet, and an infraspecific epithet.

The abbreviation "f." or the full "forma" should be put before the infraspecific epithet to indicate the rank. It is not italicised.

For example:
 Acanthocalycium spiniflorum f. klimpelianum or
 Acanthocalycium spiniflorum forma klimpelianum (Weidlich & Werderm.) Donald
 Crataegus aestivalis (Walter) Torr. & A.Gray var. cerasoides Sarg. f. luculenta Sarg. is a classification of a plant whose name is:
 Crataegus aestivalis (Walter) Torr. & A.Gray f. luculenta Sarg.

A form usually designates a group with a noticeable morphological deviation. The usual taxonomic practice is that the individuals classified within the form are not necessarily known to be closely related (they may not form a clade). For instance, white-flowered plants of species that usually have coloured flowers can be grouped and named (e.g., as "f. alba"). Formae apomicticae are sometimes named among plants that reproduce asexually, by apomixis. There are theoretically countless numbers of forms based on minor genetic differences, and only a few that have particular significance are likely to be named.

See also
 Form (zoology)
 Forma specialis, an informal rank used for a parasitic form adapted to a particular host
Trinomial nomenclature
Variety (botany)
Subvariety
Plant variety (disambiguation)
Cultivar
Hybrid (biology)
Race (biology)

References

Form
Plant taxonomy
Forma taxa